Sidi Raïs is a village and locality on Cape Bon in Tunisia.

It is located on the Gulf of Tunis ( خليج تونس ) and is notable as the last place that the Posidonia oceanica a marine phanerogam persists on the surface of the water (so-called "reef" form). It is near the bath town of Korbous. Surrounded by the Qorbus Forest and beaches of the Mediterranean,  the area has been popular as a health resort for residents of Carthage since Roman times, and extensive ruins can be found to the north near Korbous.

See also
El Brij, Tunisia
Kerkouane
Korbous
Cap Bon

References

Ancient Berber cities
Populated places in Tunisia